Bulldog Drummond at Bay may refer to:

 Bulldog Drummond at Bay (novel), a 1935 novel by Herman Cyril McNeile
 Bulldog Drummond at Bay (1937 film)
 Bulldog Drummond at Bay (1947 film)